Gangneung Airbase  is an airbase holding the 18th fighter wing of the Republic of Korea Air Force. It is located in Gangneung, Gangwon-do. The airfield has one runway (8/26), and is ILS equipped on runway 23. In the past, this airfield also used to handle civilian air traffic. The passenger handling functions of this airfield were closed prior to the opening of Yangyang International Airport

History
During the Korean War, the USAF designated the base as K-18.

In 1969, Korean Air Lines YS-11 flying from Gangneung Airbase to Gimpo International Airport in Seoul was hijacked by a North Korean agent and forced to land in the North; seven of the passengers and all four crew members among them did not return to South Korea.

On 5 October 2022, due to the failed ballistic missile test, a major explosion occurred at the air base.

References 

South Korean airbases
Korean War air bases
Buildings and structures in Gangneung
Airports established in 1958
1958 establishments in South Korea
20th-century architecture in South Korea